Microsoma exiguum is a species of fly in the family Tachinidae.

References

Diptera of Europe
Dexiinae
Insects described in 1824